Azure Vista is an album by Manual. It was released by Darla on 3 May 2005.

Track listing
"Clear Skies Above The Coastline Cathedral" – 8:38
"Summer Of Freedom" – 11:58
"Twilight" – 2:52
"Tourmaline" – 7:30
"Neon Reverie" – 8:27
"Azure Vista" – 8:23

References

External links
Angry Ape's review of Azure Vista
Opus Zine's review of Azure Vista

2005 albums